Carl Browallius (born Carl  Andersson; 7 June 1868 – 7 November 1944) was a Swedish stage and film actor.

Selected filmography
 His Lordship's Last Will (1919)
 Karin Daughter of Ingmar (1920)
 The Eyes of Love (1922)
 Thomas Graal's Ward (1922)
 Anna-Clara and Her Brothers (1923)
 The Counts at Svansta (1924)
 Life in the Country (1924)
 Her Little Majesty (1925)
 Kalle Utter (1925)
 Ingmar's Inheritance (1925)
 The Lady of the Camellias (1925)
 A Perfect Gentleman (1927)
 Sin (1928)
 Ocean Breakers (1935)
 Our Boy (1936)
 He, She and the Money (1936)
 Poor Millionaires (1936)
 Adventure (1936)
 The Andersson Family (1937)
 Sara Learns Manners (1937)
 Sun Over Sweden (1938)
 Wanted (1939)
 The People of Högbogården (1939)
 We at Solglantan (1939)

References

Bibliography
 Goble, Alan. The Complete Index to Literary Sources in Film. Walter de Gruyter, 1999.

External links

1868 births
1944 deaths
Swedish male film actors
Swedish male silent film actors
Swedish male stage actors
People from Uppsala